The Tirana Coat of Arms, also known as the Emblem of the Municipality of Tirana or the Shield of Tirana,  is the city emblem of Tirana. The emblem portrays two notable landmarks of the capital: Kulla e Sahatit (Clock Tower of Tirana) and the Tirana Castle, officially named Kalaja e Justinianit (Fortress of Justinian). The Emblem of Tirana also includes the Coat of arms of the Skuraj family One lion and Fleur-de-lis. The Skuraj was an Albanian noble family that ruled over the region of nowadays Central Albania in the Late Middle Ages.

History 
The coat of arms was approved by the city council on November 14, 2000.

References

See also 

Culture in Tirana
Tirana
Tirana
Flags displaying animals